Nicolae Munteanu (born 6 December 1931) is a Romanian ski jumper. He competed in the individual event at the 1956 Winter Olympics.

References

External links
 

1931 births
Possibly living people
Romanian male ski jumpers
Olympic ski jumpers of Romania
Ski jumpers at the 1956 Winter Olympics
Place of birth missing (living people)